Dibgashi is a rural locality (a selo) and the administrative centre of Dibgashinsky Selsoviet, Dakhadayevsky District, Republic of Dagestan, Russia. The population was 1,131 as of 2010. There are 3 streets.

Nationalities 
Dargins live there.

Geography
Dibgashi is located 9 km east of Urkarakh (the district's administrative centre) by road. Kalkni and Gunakari are the nearest rural localities.

References 

Rural localities in Dakhadayevsky District